The men's light heavyweight (81 kilograms) event at the 2014 Asian Games took place from 26 September to 3 October 2014 at Seonhak Gymnasium, Incheon, South Korea.

Like all Asian Games boxing events, the competition was a straight single-elimination tournament. All bouts consisted of three three-minute rounds. 

A total of 13 men from 13 countries competed in this event, the competition was limited to fighters whose body weight was less than 81 kilograms.

Adilbek Niyazymbetov of Kazakhstan won the gold medal. He beat Kim Hyeong-kyu from South Korea 2–1 on points in the final bout at the Seonhak Gymnasium.

Schedule
All times are Korea Standard Time (UTC+09:00)

Results 
Legend
TKO — Won by technical knockout

References

Results

External links
Official website

Boxing at the 2014 Asian Games